The 2015–16 Providence Friars men's basketball team represented Providence College in the 2015–16 NCAA Division I men's basketball season. The Friars, led by fifth-year head coach Ed Cooley, played their home games at the Dunkin' Donuts Center, and were members of the Big East Conference. They finished the season 24–11, 10–8 in Big East play to finish in a tie for fourth place. They defeated Butler in the quarterfinals of the Big East tournament to advance to the semifinals where they lost to Villanova. They received an at-large bid to the NCAA tournament as a #9 seed where they defeated USC in the first round, then lost to North Carolina in the second round.

Previous season 
The Friars finished the 2014–15 season 22–12 overall and 11–7 in Big East play to finish in fourth place. They defeated St. John's in the quarterfinals and lost to Villanova in the semifinals of the Big East tournament. The Friars received an at-large bid to the NCAA tournament as a #6 seed, losing to Dayton in the second round.

Off season

Departures

Incoming recruits

Roster

Schedule

|-
!colspan=9 style="background:#000000; color:#C0C0C0;"| Exhibition

|-
!colspan=9 style="background:#000000; color:#C0C0C0;"| Non-conference regular season

|-
!colspan=9 style="background:#000000; color:#C0C0C0;"|Big East regular season

|-
!colspan=9 style="background:#000000; color:#C0C0C0;"| Big East tournament

|-
!colspan=9 style="background:#000000; color:#C0C0C0;"| NCAA tournament

Rankings

References

Providence Friars
Providence Friars men's basketball seasons
Providence
Providence
Providence